Walter S. Wescott was a member of the Wisconsin State Assembly and the Wisconsin State Senate.

Biography
Wescott was born to John, who would become a local politician in New Glarus (town), Wisconsin, and Eunice Wescott on April 18, 1828 in Wethersfield, New York. He later owned a farm in York, Green County, Wisconsin before residing in Adams, Green County, Wisconsin and settling on another farm in Monroe, Wisconsin.

Eventually, Wescott started a cattle ranch in Custer County, Nebraska. In 1886, he established Wescott, Nebraska, where he served as a bank president.

Wescott married Thankful B. Cleveland on January 28, 1855. They would have seven children. Wescott died on March 31, 1908.

His brothers, Ezra and Jefferson, were also members of the Assembly.

Political career
Wescott was elected to the Assembly in 1859 and 1862. He was first elected to the Senate in 1863, ultimately serving two terms. Wescott was a Republican.

References

People from Wyoming County, New York
People from Green County, Wisconsin
People from Custer County, Nebraska
Republican Party Wisconsin state senators
Republican Party members of the Wisconsin State Assembly
Farmers from Wisconsin
Ranchers from Nebraska
American cattlemen
American city founders
American bank presidents
1828 births
1908 deaths
19th-century American politicians
19th-century American businesspeople